The 1992 Preakness Stakes was the 117th running of the Preakness Stakes thoroughbred horse race. The race took place on May 16, 1992, and was televised in the United States on the ABC television network. Pine Bluff, who was jockeyed by Chris McCarron, won the race by three quarters of a length over runner-up Alydeed. Approximate post time was 5:34 p.m. Eastern Time. The race was run over a fast good in a final time of 1:53-3/5.  The Maryland Jockey Club reported total attendance of 96,865, this is recorded as second highest on the list of American thoroughbred racing top attended events for North America in 1992.

Payout 

The 117th Preakness Stakes Payout Schedule

$2 Exacta:  (4–12) paid   $66.80

$2 Trifecta:  (4–12–8) paid   $519.30

The full chart 

 Winning Breeder: Loblolly Stable; (KY) 
 Final Time: 1:55 3/5
 Track Condition: Good
 Total Attendance: 96,865

See also 

 1992 Kentucky Derby

References

External links 

 

1992
1992 in horse racing
1992 in American sports
1992 in sports in Maryland
Horse races in Maryland